The Anglo-Moroccan Treaty of 1856 was a treaty between Morocco and the United Kingdom signed in Tangier on December 9, 1856. It was signed after long negotiations between John Hay Drummond Hay and Muhammad al-Khatib, representatives of Queen Victoria and Sultan Abd al-Rahman, respectively. This treaty prolonged Morocco's independence but gave major concessions to British interests, and set a precedent.

This treaty was composed of two texts: the first was a general treaty of 38 articles dealing with the status of consuls, and their privileges and their freedom of movement, as well as the settling of British subjects in the country.The second text was a treaty of commerce with 8 articles. The most important was Article 6, which set the customs tariffs at 10%. The treaty abolished the Makhzen monopoly and definitively opened trade in Morocco.

Notes and references 

1856 treaties
Treaties of Morocco
Treaties of England
Treaties of the United Kingdom